The 2018–19 Milwaukee Panthers men's basketball team represented the University of Wisconsin–Milwaukee during the 2018–19 NCAA Division I men's basketball season. The Panthers, led by second-year head coach Pat Baldwin, played their home games at the UW–Milwaukee Panther Arena and the Klotsche Center as members of the Horizon League. They finished the season 9–22, 4–14 in Horizon League play to finish in last place. They failed to qualify for the Horizon League tournament.

Previous season 
The Panthers finished the 2017–18 season 16–17, 8–10 in Horizon League play to finish in a tie for fifth place. They defeated UIC in the quarterfinals of the Horizon League tournament before losing in the semifinals to Wright State.

Roster

Schedule and results 

|-
!colspan=9 style=| Exhibition

|-
!colspan=9 style=| Non-conference regular season

|-
!colspan=9 style=| Horizon League regular season

Source:

References

Milwaukee Panthers men's basketball seasons
Milwaukee
Milwaukee
Milwaukee